The 2001 World Taekwondo Championships were the 15th edition of the World Taekwondo Championships, and were held in Jeju, South Korea from November 1 to November 7, 2001.

Medal summary

Men

Women

Medal table

Team ranking

Men

Women

References
WTF Medal Winners

External links
Official Website
WTF

World Championships
World Taekwondo Championships
World Taekwondo Championships
International taekwondo competitions hosted by South Korea
Taekwondo competitions in South Korea